South Greene is an unincorporated community in Greene County, Tennessee.

Postal service
South Greene does not have a post office or its own zip code. The closest post office is in Greeneville. South Greene shares Greeneville's zip code 37743.

Education
 Nolachuckey Elementary School
South Greene High School

References

Unincorporated communities in Greene County, Tennessee
Unincorporated communities in Tennessee